Nicholas Sutton is a property developer.

Nicholas Sutton may also refer to:
Nicholas Sutton (lawyer) (c. 1440–1478), Irish judge
Nicholas Sutton (MP), Member of Parliament (MP) for Rye
Nicholas Sutton, a character in the 1986 film Loyalties
Nicholas Todd Sutton (1961–2020), American serial killer executed in Tennessee